Paquito Hechavarría (21 February 1939 – 27 September 2012) was a Cuban pianist. Hechavarría built his career in Cuba by playing in some of the most popular orchestras, including Conjunto Casino, Orquesta Riverside and Los Armónicos. However, he is primarily known for his later work with Miami Sound Machine, the band that catapulted Gloria Estefan to international stardom. He has collaborated with popular artists such as David Byrne, Santana and Christina Aguilera.

Career 
Paquito Hechavarría was born on 21 February 1939 in Cárdenas, Matanzas, Cuba. He moved to Havana to study piano at the Conservatory. In the 1950s he began to play in important bands such as Orquesta Riverside, Conjunto Casino and Felipe Dulzaides y Los Armónicos. In 1960 he performed in Mongo Santamaría's Our Man in Havana and Walfredo de los Reyes' Cuban Jazz.

In 1962 Hechavarría moved to Miami. Two years later he recorded a jazz album with percussionist Nelson "Flaco" Padrón, who was also a member of Los Armónicos and had moved to Miami as well. His first solo album, Piano sentimental came in 1965. In the 1970s he was a member of Fly Out Band, recording the theme for ¿Qué Pasa, USA?. In 1978 he played the synthesizer on Ecué: Ritmos cubanos, an album by Louie Bellson and Walfredo de los Reyes. He recorded a solo LP, Piano alegre in 1980. In 1981 he formed a descarga ensemble called Walpataca with Walfredo de los Reyes, Cachao, and Tany Gil. He continued playing alongside Cachao, and he later played with Miami Sound Machine, recording the smash hit "Conga". He continued working with Gloria Estefan, appearing in albums such as Mi Tierra, Alma Caribeña and 90 Millas. In 1995, he collaborated with fellow Cuban singer Rey Ruiz on the song "Piano" from his album of the same name which topped the Billboard Tropical Airplay chart. He recorded his last solo album, Frankly, in 2009.

Paquito Hechavarría died on 27 September 2012 in his Miami Beach apartment.

Discography

As leader 
Sentimental Piano (Bluebell, 1965)
Piano alegre (Discolor, 1980)
Paquito y su Tumbao: Latin Jazz (Bongo Latino/Kubaney, 1994)
Piano (Sony, 1995)
Frankly (Calle 54, 2009)

As sideman 
With Louis Bellson and Walfredo de los Reyes
Ecué: Ritmos Cubanos (Pablo, 1978)

With Jorge Cabrera y su Conjunto Yumurí
La paella (Caney, 1980)
Homenaje a Arsenio Rodríguez (Kubaney, 1981)

With Cachao
Walpataca (Tania, 1981)
Maestro de Maestros (Tania, 1986)

With Miami Sound Machine and Gloria Estefan
Primitive Love (Epic, 1985)
Let It Loose (Epic, 1987)
Cuts Both Ways (Epic, 1989)
Mi Tierra (Epic, 1993)
Alma Caribeña (Epic, 2000)
90 Millas (Sony, 2007)

References

External links 
Paquito Hechavarría, AllMusic.

Cuban pianists
Latin jazz pianists
1939 births
2012 deaths
20th-century pianists
Orquesta Riverside members